Nicolae Tico (born 4 June 1953) is a Romanian sprint canoer who competed in the late 1970s and  in the early 1980s. He won two bronze medals at the ICF Canoe Sprint World Championships (K-2 10000 m: 1977, K-4 10000 m: 1978), and finished fourth in the K-2 1000 m event at the 1980 Summer Olympics in Moscow.

References

Sports-Reference.com profile

1953 births
Living people
Canoeists at the 1980 Summer Olympics
Olympic canoeists of Romania
Romanian male canoeists
ICF Canoe Sprint World Championships medalists in kayak